Hellfest is a heavy metal festival held annually in Clisson, France, since 2006.

Hellfest or Hell Fest may also refer to:

 Hellfest (American music festival), held in New York and New Jersey from 1997 to 2005
 Hell Fest, a 2018 horror film